Other Songs is the third album and second major-label album by Canadian singer-songwriter Ron Sexsmith, released on June 17, 1997 on Interscope Records. The album won the Juno Award for Roots & Traditional Album of the Year – Solo at the 1998 Juno Awards.

Track listing

References

1997 albums
Ron Sexsmith albums
Albums produced by Tchad Blake
Albums produced by Mitchell Froom
Juno Award for Roots & Traditional Album of the Year – Solo albums